Rafael Iglesias (born 5 July 1979) is  a Spanish long-distance runner who specialises in marathon running.

Achievements

References
 

1979 births
Living people
Spanish male long-distance runners